The Panam Dam is constructed over the Panam River in India. It is located at Santrampur Taluka of Mahisagar district in Gujarat state. Panam is a tributary of the Mahi River, it originates from Devgadh Baria Taluka of Dahod district.

A mini hydro power plant of 2 Megawatts capacity was constructed over the Panam canal in 1994. The construction of the canal was completed in 1999.

See also
Kadana Dam and Mahi Bajaj Sagar Dam on Mahi River
Ukai Dam
Sardar Sarovar Dam

References 

Dams in Gujarat
Mahisagar district
Hydroelectric power stations in Gujarat
Masonry dams
Dams completed in 1999
1999 establishments in Gujarat
20th-century architecture in India